WAZX (1550 kHz) is a commercial AM radio station licensed to the city of Smyrna, Georgia, and serving the Atlanta metropolitan area.  It is currently owned by Tron Dinh Do, through licensee Intelli LLC. The station's transmitter is located in Powder Springs, Georgia.

History
In March, 1962, the station first signed on as WSMA.  It was a 10,000-watt daytimer, owned by Mitchell Melof.

The radio station has had the WAZX call sign since 1993, when it changed from its long-time WYNX call sign. The WYNX call sign dates back to 1965 when the station switched to a Top 40 radio format from a Middle of the Road (MOR) radio format.

The radio station was formerly a Spanish language station broadcasting a variety format, branded as "La Que Buena", and owned by Ga-Mex Broadcasting from 2001 until 2008.  Ga-Mex Broadcasting fell into financial difficulties in 2008.  That required the station to go dark from mid-July 2008 until Ga-Mex Broadcasting declared bankruptcy and the station was sold to DTS Broadcasting in 2009.

WAZX was again heard broadcasting on August 3, 2009, during a testing period with only oldies and classic rock music plus the station identification at the top of the hour. This test period began August 1, 2009.

WAZX returned to the air on February 10, 2010, with Spanish language Christian music and talk programming under the "La Estación de la Familia" name.

DTS Broadcasting sold WAZX to Tron Dinh Do's Intelli LLC for a purchase price of $1.55 million; the transaction was consummated on May 21, 2014.

WAZX was again heard broadcasting on March 13, 2015, with only oldies and classic rock music plus the station ID at the top of the hour.

WAZX was on the air for most of 2020, playing continuous oldies music and classic rock (mostly from the '60s to the '80s), interspersed with periodic automated time announcements and a legal ID at the top of the hour.  The station went off the air again after the first week of January 2021.

References

External links

Satellite view of WAZX (AM) antenna towers on Google Maps

AZX
Radio stations established in 1965
Oldies radio stations in the United States